Wilhelmina Jallah is a Liberian physician and politician. She is Minister for Health in Liberia.

President George Manneh Weah  appointed Jallah as Health Minister in February 2018. In March 2021 she launched the Covid vaccination effort in Liberia, and was herself vaccinated in front of television cameras.

References

Year of birth missing (living people)
Living people
Health ministers of Liberia
Women government ministers of Liberia
Liberian physicians